Stade Auguste Bonal is a multi-purpose stadium in Montbéliard, France.  It is used mostly for football matches. It is the home ground of FC Sochaux-Montbéliard. The stadium is able to hold 20,025 people. Constructed in 1931, it has undergone several renovations, most recently in 2000.

Gallery

References

External links 

Stadium information

Auguste Bonal
Auguste Bonal
Multi-purpose stadiums in France
Sports venues in Doubs
Buildings and structures in Montbéliard
Sports venues completed in 1931